Antoinette Delali Kemavor is a Ghanaian model and beauty pageant titleholder who was crowned Miss World Ghana in 2015 and represented Ghana at the Miss World 2016 pageant. She has been spotted in countless music videos, and TV commercials.

Personal life

Miss World Ghana 2015
Antoinette was crowned Miss World Ghana in 2015. As Miss World Ghana 2015, she competed at the Miss World 2016 pageant.

Miss World 2016
Antoinette represented Ghana at Miss World 2016 pageant where she placed Top 20.

References

Year of birth missing (living people)
Ghanaian beauty pageant winners
Ghanaian female models
Miss World 2016 delegates
Living people